The Iranian calendars or Iranian chronology are a succession of calendars invented or used for over two millennia in Iran, also known as Persia. One of the longest chronological records in human history, the Iranian calendar has been modified time and again during its history to suit administrative, climatic, and religious purposes. The most influential person in laying the frameworks for the calendar and its precision was the 11th century Persian polymath, hakim Omar Khayyam. The modern Iranian calendar is currently the official civil calendar in Iran and Afghanistan. 

The Iranian new year begins at the midnight nearest to the instant of the northern spring equinox, as determined by astronomic calculations for the meridian (52.5°E). It is, therefore, an observation-based calendar, unlike the Gregorian, which is rule-based. This equinox occurs on or about 20 March of the Gregorian calendar. The time zone of Iran is Iran Standard Time, UTC+03:30.

History

Ancient calendars 

The earliest evidence of Iranian calendrical traditions is from the second millennium BC and possibly even predates the appearance of the Iranian prophet Zoroaster. The first fully preserved calendar is that of the Achaemenids, a royal dynasty of the 5th century BC who gave rise to Zoroastrianism. Throughout recorded history, Persians have been keen on the idea and importance of having a calendar. They were among the first cultures to use a solar calendar and have long favoured a solar over lunar and lunisolar approaches. The sun has always been a religious and divine symbol in Iranian culture and is the origin of the folklore regarding Cyrus the Great.

Old Persian calendar 
Old Persian inscriptions and tablets indicate that early Iranians used a 360-day calendar based on the solar observation directly and modified for their beliefs. Days were not named. The months had two or three divisions depending on the phase of the moon. Twelve months of 30 days were named for festivals or activities of the pastoral year. An intercalation month was added periodically to keep the calendar synchronized with the seasons.

The following table lists the Old Persian months, alongside the approximate Gregorian months and approximate Babylonian lunar months.

There were four farming festivals, symmetric about maidyoshahem:

Two more festivals were later added, creating the six gahanbar:

Zoroastrian calendar

The first calendars based on Zoroastrian cosmology appeared in the later Achaemenid period (650 to 330 BC). They evolved over the centuries, but month names changed little until now.

The unified Achaemenid Empire required a distinctive Iranian calendar, and one was devised in Egyptian tradition, with 12 months of 30 days, each dedicated to a yazata (Eyzad), and four divisions resembling the Semitic week. Four days per month were dedicated to Ahura Mazda and seven were named after the six Amesha Spentas. Thirteen days were named after Fire, Water, Sun, Moon, Tiri and Geush Urvan (the soul of all animals), Mithra, Sraosha (Soroush, yazata of prayer), Rashnu (the Judge), Fravashi, Bahram (yazata of victory), Raman (Ramesh meaning peace), and Vata, the divinity of the wind. Three were dedicated to the female divinities, Daena (yazata of religion and personified conscious), Ashi (yazata of fortune) and Arshtat (justice). The remaining four were dedicated to Asman (lord of sky or Heaven), Zam (earth), Manthra Spenta (the Bounteous Sacred Word) and Anaghra Raocha (the 'Endless Light' of paradise).

The month names and their modern versions are given in the following table.

The calendar had a significant impact on religious observance. It fixed the pantheon of major divinities, and also ensured that their names were uttered often, since at every Zoroastrian act of worship the yazatas of both day and month were invoked. It also clarified the pattern of festivities; for example, Mitrakanna or Mehregan was celebrated on Mithra day of Mithra month, and the Tiri festival (Tiragan) was celebrated on Tiri day of the Tiri month.

In 538 BC Cyrus the Great (uncertain if he was a Zoroastrian) conquered Babylon and the Babylonian luni-solar calendar came into use for civil purposes.  Cambyses conquered Egypt in 525 BC.  He was accompanied by Darius, a Zoroastrian who became ruler of the Persian empire in 517 BC. The Zoroastrians adopted the wandering Egyptian solar calendar of twelve months of thirty days plus five epagomenal days. As their year began in the spring (with the festival of norouz) the epagomenai were placed just before norouz.

In Egypt the star Sirius had significance since every 1460 years (the Sothic cycle) its heliacal rising (just before sunrise) marked the Egyptian new year and the inundation of the Nile.   In Persia also the star had significance, since its heliacal rising there also coincided with the coming of the rain.   The fourth Persian month was Tishtrya (Sirius, rain star).   The vernal equinox at Greenwich fell on the first day of the first month from 487 to 483 BC (inclusive).   Adopting S H Taqizadeh's date of 28 March 487 BC for the reform the calendar for that year is as follows:

The fourth month includes 20 July, the date of the heliacal rising of Sirius.   In the first year the people carried on using the old calendar, anticipating festival dates by five days.   As each day is named after a god, it is important to observe the celebrations on the right day.   Thus the fravasis festival, which in the old calendar was kept between sunset on 30 Spandarmad and sunrise on 1 Frawardin, was now observed throughout the epagomenai.   In the second year of the reform, the old 30 Spandarmad was the new 25 Spandarmad, so from then on the festival covered eleven days, up to the new 1 Frawardin.   Five days was considered enough for other festivals, however.

In all the lands where the Persian calendar was used the epagomenai were placed at the end of the year.   To offset the difference between the agricultural year and the calendar year (the tax-gathering season began after the harvest) the start of the araji (land-tax) year was delayed by one month every 120 years.   A Roman historian, Quintus Curtius Rufus, describing a ceremony in 333 BC, writes:

The magi were followed by three hundred and sixty-five young men clad in purple robes, equal in number to the days of a whole year; for the Persians also divided the year into that number of days.

After the conquests by Alexander the Great and his death, the Persian territories fell to one of his generals, Seleucus (312 BC), starting the Seleucid dynasty of Iran. Based on the Greek tradition, Seleucids introduced the practice of dating by era rather than by the reign of individual kings. Their era became known as that of Alexander, or later the Seleucid era. Since the new rulers were not Zoroastrians, Zoroastrian priests lost their function at the royal courts, and so resented the Seleucids.   Although they began dating by eras, they established their own era of Zoroaster.

That was the first serious attempt to determine the dates associated with the prophet Zoroaster's life. Priests had no Zoroastrian historical sources, and so turned to Babylonian archives famous in the ancient world. From these they learned that a great event in Persian history took place 228 years before the era of Alexander. In fact, this was the conquest of Babylon by Cyrus the Great in 539 BC. But the priests misinterpreted this date to be the time the "true faith" was revealed to their prophet, and since Avestan literature indicates that revelation happened when Zoroaster was 30 years old, 568 BC was taken as his year of birth. The date entered written records as the beginning of the era of Zoroaster, and indeed, the Persian Empire. This incorrect date is still mentioned in many current encyclopedias as Zoroaster's birth date.

Modifications by Parthians, Ardashir I, Hormizd I, Yazdgerd III 
The Parthians (Arsacid dynasty) adopted the same calendar system with minor modifications, and dated their era from 248 BC, the date they succeeded the Seleucids. Their names for the months and days are Parthian equivalents of the Avestan ones used previously, differing slightly from the Middle Persian names used by the Sassanians. For example, in Achaemenid times the modern Persian month 'Day' was called Dadvah (Creator), in Parthian it was Datush and the Sassanians named it Dadv/Dai (Dadar in Pahlavi).

When in April of AD 224 the Parthian dynasty fell and was replaced by the Sasanid, the new king, Ardashir I, abolished the official Babylonian calendar and replaced it with the Zoroastrian.   This involved a correction to the places of the gahanbar, which had slipped back in the seasons since they were fixed.   These were placed eight months later, as were the epagemonai, the 'Gatha' or 'Gah' days after the ancient Zoroastrian hymns of the same name.   Other countries, such as the Armenians and Choresmians, did not accept the change.   The new dates were:

In AD 224 the vernal equinox at Greenwich fell at noon on 21 March, which was 22 Shahrewar.   Immediately after the reform 21 March corresponded to 27 Shahrewar.   Here is the calendar for AD 225–6:

The change caused confusion and was immensely unpopular.   The new epagemonai were referred to as "robber days".   The people now observed the "Great" nowruz on 6 Frawardin, which was Zoroaster's birthday and corresponded to 1 Frawardin in the old calendar.   The new 1 Frawardin was observed as the "lesser" nowruz.   Hormizd I (AD 272–273) made the intervening days into festivals as well.   In AD 273, the vernal equinox at 0° fell at 05:00 UTC on 21 March.

Yazdegerd I reigned from AD 399–420.   In AD 400 the equinox fell about 19 March, which was 9 Aban.   According to al-Biruni, in that reign there was a double adjustment of the start of the araji year.   The tenth-century astronomer Abu'l-asan Kusyar noted that during the reign of Osrow II (AD 589–628) the sun entered Aries in Adur.   This happened throughout his reign.   An araji era was introduced dating from AD 621, and the Yazdegerdi era dates from 16 June AD 632, so the Yazdegerdi era is eleven years behind the araji.

Muslim conquest

The Muslim rulers who took over from the middle of the seventh century used the Islamic calendar for administration, which caused hardship because the year was shorter – i.e. a tax which was formerly collected after the harvest would now have to be paid before the harvest.   Traditionally it is said that the caliph Omar reintroduced the Persian calendar for tax collection purposes.

In AD 895 there was another double readjustment of the start of the araji year.   It moved from 1 Frawardin (12 April) to 1 Khordad (11 June).   By AD 1006 the vernal equinox, 15 March, was again coinciding with nowruz, 1 Frawardin.   In that year, therefore, the epagemonai were delayed four months, moving from the end of Aban to their old position at the end of Spandarmad.   This is the calendar for AD 1006/7:

The gahanbar didn't move quite to their old places, because the fifth moved to 20 Day, which was the old 15 Day, thus increasing the interval between the fourth and fifth to eighty days and reducing the interval between the fifth and sixth to 75 days.   The new dates were:

Medieval era: Jalali calendar

In AD 1079, by the order of the Jalal Al-Din Shah Seljuqi, the Islamic Calendar (which was and is based on the lunar system) was replaced in Persia by the calendar of Omar Khayyam and was called the Jalali Calendar. Khayyam and his team had worked 8 years in Isfahan, the capital of Iran during the Seljuq dynasty. The research and creation of the Khayyam calendar was financially supported by Jalal Al din Shah. Khayyam designed his calendar in which the beginning of the new year, season and month are aligned and he named the first day of the spring and the new year to be Norooz (also spelled Nowruz). Before Khayyam's calendar, Norooz was not a fixed day and each year could fall in late winter or early spring.

From 15 March 1079, when the calendar had slipped a further eighteen days, the araji calendar was reformed by repeating the first eighteen days of Frawardin. Thus 14 March was 18 Frawardin qadimi (old) or farsi (Persian) and 15 March was 1 Frawardin jalali or maleki (royal). This new calendar was astronomically calculated, so that it did not have epagemonai – the months began when the sun entered a new sign of the zodiac.

About 120 years after the reform of AD 1006, when the vernal equinox was starting to fall in Ardawahisht, Zoroastrians made it again coincide with nowruz by adding a second Spandarmad. This Shensai calendar was a month behind the qadimi still used in Persia, being used only by the Zoroastrians in India, the Parsees. On 6 June 1745 (Old Style) some Parsees re-adopted the qadimi calendar, and in 1906 some adopted the Fasli calendar in which 1 Frawardin was equated with 21 March, so that there was a sixth epagomenal day every four years.   In 1911 the jalali calendar became the official national calendar of Persia. Some Zoroastrians in Persia now use the Fasli calendar, having begun changing to it in 1930.

Modern calendar: Solar Hijri (SH) 

The present Iranian calendar was legally adopted on 31 March 1925, under the early Pahlavi dynasty. The law said that the first day of the year should be the first day of spring in "the true solar year", "as it has been" ever so. It also fixed the number of days in each month, which previously varied by year with the sidereal zodiac. It revived the ancient Persian names, which are still used. 1 Farvardin is the day whose midnight start is nearest to the instant of vernal equinox. The first six months have 31 days, the next five thirty, and the twelfth has 29 days and 30 in leap years. 

It specified the origin of the calendar to be the Hijrah of Muhammad from Mecca to Medina in AD 622. It also deprecated the 12-year cycles of the Chinese-Uighur calendar which were not officially sanctioned but were commonly used.

In 1976, Shah Mohammad Reza Pahlavi changed the origin of the calendar to the beginning of Cyrus the Great's reign as its first year, rather than the Hijra of Muhammad. Overnight, the year changed from 1355 to 2535. This change only lasted until the Iranian revolution in 1979, at which time the calendar reverted to Solar Hijri.

Correspondence of Solar Hijri and Gregorian calendars (Solar Hijri leap years are marked *):

See also 

 Solar Hijri calendar
 Tabarian calendar
 Armenian calendar
 Lunar Hijri calendar
 Pre-Islamic Arabian calendar
 Assyrian calendar
 Mandaean calendar
 Hebrew calendar
 Babylonian calendar
 Anno Graecorum
 Rumi calendar
 Royal stars
 Shanbeh

References

Citations

Bibliography 
 
 Taqîzâda, Sayyid Ḥasan, Gâhshumârî dar Îrân-i qadîm, Tehran (Čapkhâna-yi Majlis) 1316/1937-1938, (reprinted with the author's notes appointed to the first edition in the 10th vol. of the Opera omnia, ed.by Î. Afshâr, Tehran, 1357/1978-79). Complete Italian ed.: H. Taqizadeh, Il computo del tempo nell'Iran antico, ed. and transl. by S. Cristoforetti, Roma (ISIAO), 2010.

External links 
 How the leap years are calculated
 Meaning of the names of the months in the Persian Calendar
 Persian(shamsi)/Gregorian/Islamic(hijri) Windows Gadget – with persian occasions

 Online calendars and converters
 PersDay.com: Online Persian Calendar and Memo Book Web Application specially designed for Iranians, shows Persian(Hijri-Shamsi), Gregorian, and Hijri-Ghamari calendars for each day; Users can write different types of notes for each day, week, month, season, or year.
 An online Persian(shamsi)/Gregorian/Islamic(hijri) date converter on http://www.iranchamber.com
 Online Persian Calendar from aaahoo portal
 Online Persian Calendar from parstimes.com portal
 An online simple Shamsi/Gregorian date converter

 Programming
 GPL Iranian Calendar in JavaScript 
 System.Globalization.PersianCalendar class documentation in MSDN Library (The implementation of the Persian Calendar in Microsoft .NET Framework 2.0)
 Persian Zodiac a free, open source AIR application. 
 JalaliCalendar (The implementation  of the Persian Calendar in java)

Calendars
Calendar
Calendars
Specific calendars
Iranian inventions